Françoise Lucas (born 15 March 1939) is a French speed skater. She competed at the 1960 Winter Olympics and the 1964 Winter Olympics.

References

1939 births
Living people
French female speed skaters
Olympic speed skaters of France
Speed skaters at the 1960 Winter Olympics
Speed skaters at the 1964 Winter Olympics
Sportspeople from Paris